A Palestinian suicide bombing occurred in the Beit Yisrael neighborhood in downtown Jerusalem on March 2, 2002. Eleven Israeli civilians were killed in the attack, including two infants, three children and two teenagers. Over 50 people were injured in the attack, four of them critically. The bombing took place at the entrance of the Haredi yeshiva "Beit Yisrael" in central Jerusalem where people had gathered for a bar mitzvah celebration. The suicide bomber detonated the bomb full of shrapnel alongside a group of women with their baby strollers, waiting for the services in a nearby synagogue to conclude. The Palestinian militant organization al-Aqsa Martyrs' Brigades claimed responsibility for the attack.

The attack

The bombing took place on Saturday evening in the Haredi Beit Yisrael neighborhood of Jerusalem, a neighborhood that had been targeted in three previous attacks.

Shortly after 7 PM, the streets were crowded with worshippers who had just finished the sun-down prayers that mark the conclusion of the Shabbat. People had gathered near the Mahane Yisrael yeshiva for the bar mitzvah of Naveh Hazan. Another family, the Hajabis, were also celebrating their son's bar mitzvah, and members of the related Nehmad and Ilan families had arrived in Jerusalem for the celebration.  Upwards of 1,000 Jews prayed every Saturday evening at the Mahane Israel seminary.

The bomber was standing alongside a group of women with baby carriages who were waiting for their husbands to return from the synagogue, and blew himself up just as the family and guests were beginning to leave. The ensuing blast shook downtown Jerusalem, and ignited a nearby car. Among the dead were an infant and her six-year-old brother, a mother and her three-year-old son, and a 12-year-old boy. The dead included members of the Hajabi, Hazan, Nehmad, and Ilan families. A woman who was pregnant with twins survived but lost both of her unborn children. Two babies were taken to Hadassah Medical Center, the whereabouts of their parents unknown.

The bombing occurred only meters from the site of a previous car bombing the year before. At the Mahane Yisrael seminary, a stone wall was splattered in blood.

Shlomi, an eyewitness, saw a baby carriage alongside a dead baby and other dead people. Another witness said that she and everyone else in her family had been injured when the bomber attacked:

Eitan of the Magen David Adom recounted:

Livnat, the sister of Sofia Ya'arit Eliyahu who died in the blast with her seven-month-old son, described her experience:

Fatalities
Ten people were killed instantly in the attack, and an eleventh died later of his injuries. 8 of those fatilaies were from the Nehmad family. Over 50 people were injured.

Perpetrators
The al-Aqsa Martyrs' Brigades, the armed wing of Fatah, claimed responsibility and said the attack was to avenge the deaths of 19 Palestinians killed during Israeli military incursions into the Balata and Jenin refugee camps earlier in the week. The bomber was identified as 19-year-old Mohammed al-Chouhani from the Dheisheh refugee camp near Bethlehem. Around 1,500 Palestinians celebrated through the camp handing out sweets and shooting in the air.

Official reactions
Involved parties
:
 The Israeli government sources said they would hold Yasser Arafat was personally responsible, as the Al-Aqsa Brigades were under his control.
 Tzipi Livni said, "the difference between Israel and the Palestinian Authority, and between Israelis and Palestinians, is that terrorists are deliberately targeting civilians, and you will never find that in what the IDF forces are doing."

:
 The PA cabinet criticized the attack, though stating that Israel was responsible for the escalation of the violence.
 Hundreds of Palestinians celebrated on hearing the news and took to the streets firing guns into the air.
 Marwan Barghouti, a leader in the Fatah movement promised that his organization would continue the attacks on Israel. "The resistance forces will continue to strike at the Zionist enemy and I am certain that the force of these strikes will even increase."

 Supranational
 – United Nations High Commissioner for Human Rights Mary Robinson expressed her shock and horror and said, "Acts of suicide bombings in Israel harm the interests and aspirations of the Palestinian people because they undermine support for the cause of self-determination and the fight against occupation."

 International
 – The US State Department harshly condemned this "terrorist outrage". "Such murder of innocent citizens cannot be justified and can only harm the interests and aspirations of the Palestinian people in progress toward a better future ... We call upon Chairman Arafat and the Palestinian Authority to do everything possible to confront and stop the terrorists responsible for these criminal acts."

Burials

The Nehamad family were buried in Rishon Letzion. The Israeli Health Minister, Nissim Dahan, said of the dead: "They cut off the most beautiful flowers before their time was due." The eulogies expressed feelings of bitterness and anger. Sofia Ya'arit Eliyahu, 23, and her seven-month-old son, Avraham Eliyahu were buried at Moshav Noam.

External links 
 Suicide bombing in the Beit Yisrael neighborhood in Jerusalem, 2 March 2002 – published at the Israeli Ministry of Foreign Affairs
 In Jerusalem, Suicide Bomber Kills at Least 9 – published on 3 March 2002 in the New York Times
 UN rights chief Robinson says shocked by Jerusalem bombing – published on 4 March 2002 in Ha'aretz

See also

 Civilian casualties in the Second Intifada
 Israeli casualties of war

References

Suicide bombings in 2002
Murdered Israeli children
Children in war
Israeli terrorism victims
Deaths by person in Asia
Terrorist incidents in Israel in 2002
Massacres in 2002
Israeli casualties in the Second Intifada
Massacres in Israel during the Israeli–Palestinian conflict
Suicide bombing in the Israeli–Palestinian conflict
Terrorist attacks attributed to Palestinian militant groups
Terrorist incidents in Jerusalem
March 2002 events in Asia